Jamnica is a dispersed settlement in the hills northwest of Prevalje in the Carinthia region in northern Slovenia, right on the border with Austria.

Name
The name of the settlement was changed from Jamnica to Zgornja Jamnica (literally, 'upper Jamnica') in 1955. This corresponded to the name change of Šentanel to Spodnja Jamnica (literally, 'lower Jamnica') the same year. The name Jamnica was restored in 1998.

References

External links
Jamnica on Geopedia

Populated places in the Municipality of Prevalje